Simen Standerholen (born 15 October 1993) is a retired Norwegian football midfielder.

Growing up in Berg, Østfold club Berg IL, he joined the junior setup of Fredrikstad and was also capped as a Norway youth international. He made his Eliteserien debut in June 2011 against Odd, and also played two matches in 2012 Eliteserien (and was loaned out to Østsiden) before Fredrikstad was relegated. He featured during the next two 1. divisjon seasons. He was released ahead of the 2016 season.

References

1993 births
Living people
People from Halden
Norway youth international footballers
Norwegian footballers
Fredrikstad FK players
Østsiden IL players
Eliteserien players
Norwegian First Division players
Association football midfielders
Sportspeople from Viken (county)